Major General Cyril Mosley Wagstaff  (5 March 1878 – 21 February 1934) was a British Army officer who became Commandant of the Royal Military Academy, Woolwich.

Military career

Educated at the United Services College, Wagstaff was commissioned into the Royal Engineers in 1897. He served on the North West Frontier of India and in the First World War with the Australian Army and is credited with creating the term ANZAC. He was appointed a General Staff Officer at the War Office in 1925, Commander of the Nowshera Brigade on the North West Frontier of India in 1928 and Commandant of the Royal Military Academy Woolwich in 1930 before his death in 1934.

Family
In 1906 he married Rosabel Thelwall. Following the death of his first wife, he married Marjorie Frances Fry in 1927.

References

External links
 Wagstaff war narrative, 18-20 May 1915 / Cyril Mosley Wagstaff held at State Library of New South Wales, retrieved 24 November 2013.

1878 births
1934 deaths
British Army major generals
Commandants of the Royal Military Academy, Woolwich
Companions of the Order of the Bath
Companions of the Order of St Michael and St George
Companions of the Order of the Indian Empire
Companions of the Distinguished Service Order
People educated at United Services College
Royal Engineers officers
British Army generals of World War I